The Canon FT QL is a 35mm single-lens reflex camera introduced by Canon Inc. in March 1966.  It has a Canon FL lens mount compatible with the large range of FL series lenses. The FT can also operate the later Canon FD series lenses in stop-down mode, but the earlier R series has a different lens aperture mechanism and cannot be used, although the bayonet fitting is similar. The standard kit lenses were Canon's 50mm f/1.8 ; 50mm f/1.4 and 58mm f/1.2, the body-only option was offered later.

FT QL was introduced in March 1966, a year after the pellicle mirrored Canon Pellix. However it differs from the Pellix models, having a normal quick-return reflex mirror and offering stop-down TTL metering. The TTL metering is semi-spot in nature and works through a prism incorporated in the viewfinder condenser/screen assembly. The later Canon F-1 has a similar prism for metering in its removable screen. The Canon FT viewfinder screen is not user changeable. The pentaprism finder is fixed like the similar FX and FP models but unlike some earlier Canon R reflexes.

The cloth focal plane shutter has speeds from 1 sec to 1/1000 and B. The electronic flash sync. speed is 1/60. A delayed action timer gives 8 – 10 seconds delay, using the same front of body lever that actuates the stop-down metering. The mirror can be locked up for vibration reduction or for use with special FL lenses like the original 19mm f3.5 wide angle which projects deeply into the body and would foul the mirror.

The QL designation was a reference to Canon's ingenious and successful "quick load" system. A stainless steel sprung hinged device inside the rear door makes film loading simpler than competing cameras of the era. You just laid the film's leader over the drive gear and take-up fingers and closed the back. It also made it "repeatable" - by always putting the same sprocket hole over the drive gear you could rewind a partially-shot roll (leaving its leader out) and put it back in later. You'd just click past the already-taken frames (with the lens cap on) and then continue. This made it possible to switch back and forth between types of film: black and white, color negative, and color slide.

An accessory device, the Canon Booster, worked only with the FT QL and Pellix QL. It is a plug-in device that sits on the accessory shoe and increases the metering sensitivity by a factor of 16 for measuring exposure in poor light. Its operation is somewhat clumsy and is best kept for tripod use.

The Canon FT is one of a series of three basically identical cameras released around this time. The first was the Canon FX which had a built-in meter, but no through-the-lens (TTL) metering, instead using a window on the camera body front. The later entry level FP has no built-in meter. The final model was the top of this sector, the Canon FT QL, which was developed to combat the growing popularity of the Pentax Spotmatic variants as well as the Topcon RE SLRs.

The FT QL and its sisters were an important step for Canon, leading to a number of improved versions such as the FTb and the full professional camera system the F-1. FT QL production ended in 1972 after the FTb was introduced.

During the production run of the Canon FT QL, Canon quietly upgraded some components and made minor cosmetic changes.  Some of the changes are listed below:

- Text font size become bolder and more legible.

- The battery charge lever font color has been changed from blue to black.

- The serial number has been relocated from the rear of the camera, next to the viewfinder, to the top plate, below the battery charge lever.

- The "Canon Camera Company. Inc." text is removed from the back of the camera.

- The "Made in Japan" text is relocated from the rear of the camera, to the bottom of the camera.

- The screw-in battery compartment lid adds a coin slot for easier access.

- The film pressure plate is significantly larger for better alignment.

- The mirror lock up lever is slightly larger for easier handling. 

- The circular hump is removed from the back of the camera. under the film rewind knob.   

- The rear film transport area next to the shutter has an extra step for smoother operation.

References

 Photography in Malaysia *Canon FT QL camera Retrieved on October 22, 2005.
 Canon FT QL by luis triguez

Canon FL cameras